Unbutton Your Heart is the debut studio album by Penny Hill. It was released on 12 March 2010.

Track listing
 "Salem" - 3:48
 "(un)Certainties" - 2:57
 "Summertime" - 3:21
 "The Wind (For Margaret)" - 3:49
 "This Fire" - 5:29
 "Song for John" - 3:10
 "Where the Light Is" - 6:41
 "Waiting" - 5:33
 "Not in Love" - 5:33

References

2010 debut albums